Kenny Travis (born February 6, 1965) is a retired American professional basketball player.

Career
A junior college standout, Travis played two years at New Mexico State from the 1985–86 to 1986–87 season. In his final year, he averaged 20.2 points, 7.3 rebounds, 2.6 assists and 1.8 steals with a 46.4% hit from the three-point range. Those statistics convinced the Los Angeles Lakers to choose him in the sixth round of the 1987 NBA draft.

Travis played for the Fresno Flames in the World Basketball League in the summer of 1988. He later played in the Philippine Basketball Association that same year, and spent four more seasons in the PBA from 1992 to 1995, while playing for San Miguel Beermen.

References

1965 births
Living people
Basketball players from California
Fresno City Rams men's basketball players
Los Angeles Lakers draft picks
New Mexico State Aggies men's basketball players
Philippine Basketball Association imports
American expatriate basketball people in the Philippines
Shooting guards
Small forwards
San Miguel Beermen players
Tri-City Chinook players
American men's basketball players